Chandan Nagar is a sub-urban locality of Indore in the state of Madhya Pradesh, India.

It lies under the jurisdiction of the Indore Municipal Corporation. The name's literal meaning is Sandalwood.

History
It is composed of 8 sectors designated A to H, with more than 300 houses in each. There are many high schools and madrasas in the locality.

Geography
The Indore International Airport campus borders Chandan Nagar on the Northern end. It is surrounded by Kalani Nagar on the Eastern side. The Sirpur Lake occupies its southern border.

Politics
Chandan Nagar area falls under the Indore-1 Assembly Constituency in Indore District. The current elected Member is Sanjay Shukla from the Congress.

Transport
The nearest railway station is Indore Junction railway station. Public transport such as autos, taxis, magic-vans, city buses are readily available.
Bus Routes passing by the main Chandan Nagar Square are:-

Places of interest

Sirpur Lake: A Lake, which is a biodiversity hotspot and famous for being the destination of migratory birds during winters.
Gangwal Bus Stand: An Inter-State Bus Stand for hopping onto buses on NH 47 for Ahmedabad, Dhar, Betma, Rajgarh.

See also
Azad Nagar

References

Suburbs of Indore
Neighbourhoods in Indore